"1/2 & 1/2" is a single by Gang Starr (feat. M.O.P.), taken from the soundtrack album Blade: Music from and Inspired by the Motion Picture, although it was not featured in the film itself. The song was later included on Gang Starr's album Full Clip: A Decade of Gang Starr. The track features samples from Jimmy Webb's "Gymnast's Ballet (Fingerpainting)", Mobb Deep's "Survival of the Fittest", M.O.P.'s "New Jack City", and Brother Arthur's "What You Gonna Do".

The B-side to the single was "Gangsta Bounce" by Wolfpak.

Track listing
US CD
 "1/2 & 1/2" (Clean Radio) - Gang Starr
 "1/2 & 1/2" (Street) - Gang Starr
 "1/2 & 1/2" (Instrumental) - Gang Starr
 "Gangsta Bounce" - Wolfpak (5:27)

References 

1998 singles
Gang Starr songs
M.O.P. songs
Hardcore hip hop songs
Songs written by DJ Premier
Song recordings produced by DJ Premier